Firmin Gillot, father of Charles Gillot (1820–1872), invented in 1852 the paniconograph for which he took a patent (photoengraving in relief according to the letterpress on several early plate).  Later, he invented a new process, again in relief, but nonphotographic.  

Around 1870, his son Charles Gillot developed the Gillotage process (photomechanical). This process quickly predominated the illustrated newspapers and books of the period, such as for example:  Le Charivari, Le Rire, L'assiette au beurre, Gil Blas Illustre, and many others.  

Gillot's Paris address in 1875 was Vve Gillot and Fils, 175, a street of Suburb-Saint-Martin, Paris.

External links
LeRire.com - Features examples of Chromotypographic illustration.
L'assiette au beurre - Belle epoque Chromotypograph Journal.

19th-century French inventors
1820 births
1872 deaths